Potomac High School is the name of several schools in the United States.

 Potomac High School (Oxon Hill, Maryland), Oxon Hill, Maryland
 Potomac High School (Virginia), Dumfries, Virginia
 Potomac Falls High School, Sterling, Virginia
 West Potomac High School, Fairfax County, Virginia

See also
 Potomac School (disambiguation)